Triathle is a sub-sport of modern pentathlon consisting of running, swimming and shooting.

Sport
Triathle is an event that involves cross country running, freestyle swimming, and laser pistol shooting in multiple sequences. The legs are raced with continuous transitions. Triathle competitions are held under rules of the Union Internationale de Pentathlon Moderne (UIPM). 
The sequence of a triathle competition is:
 Pack Start (up to 25 m from the shooting station)
 Shooting (5 targets in 50 seconds)
 Swimming (25 to 50 m)
 Running (200 to 800 m)
 [...] Repetition of shooting, swimming and running according to the age group (2 to 4 repetitions)
 Finish: The first person crossing the finish line is the winner.

A triathle contains  of the disciplines of a modern pentathlon: épée fencing and equestrian show jumping are omitted. Compared to another sport under the governance of the UIPM: triathle is a laser-run with additional swimming.

Triathle is a multisport in its own right with the focus on middle-distances. It bears strong resemblance to triathlon (swimming, cycling and running) which is an endurance sport.

Triathle World Championships
The Triathle World Championships have been held since 2013. They are usually combined with biathle events.
{| 
|

Senior medallists

Men

Men's team

Women

Women's team

Mixed relay

Sources

External links
  UIPM Triathle webpage
 Biathle/Triathle rules
 Information on Triathle (German)

Multisports
Modern pentathlon